Live at the Whisky a Go-Go on the Fabulous Sunset Strip is the seventh album and first live album by American rock band X, released April 29, 1988 by Elektra Records. The album was recorded on December 13, 15 and 16 in 1987 at the Whisky a Go Go nightclub in West Hollywood, California, United States.

Three of the tracks ("In the Time It Takes," "Just Another Perfect Day," and "True Love") were only included on the vinyl version but omitted from the compact disc edition.

Track listing
All songs written by John Doe and Exene Cervenka except as indicated.

Side one
 "Los Angeles" – 2:54
 "House I Call Home" – 2:33  
 "The New World" – 3:00
 "Around My Heart" – 4:19
 "Surprise, Surprise" – 2:44
 "Because I Do" – 2:22

Side two
 "Burning House of Love" – 4:22
 "My Goodness" – 4:05
 "Blue Spark" – 2:13
 "In the Time It Takes" – 2:55 (not included on CD release)
 "The Once Over Twice" – 2:35
 "Devil Doll" (includes excerpt of "Just Like Tom Thumb's Blues" (Bob Dylan)) – 4:27

Side three
 "The Hungry Wolf" – 3:51
 "Just Another Perfect Day" – 4:33 (not included on CD release)
 "Unheard Music" – 4:10
 "Riding with Mary" – 3:45
 "World's a Mess" – 3:33

Side four
 "True Love" – 2:36 (not included on CD release)
 "White Girl" – 3:40
 "Skin Deep Town" – 3:16
 "So Long" (Woody Guthrie) – 4:00
 "The Call of the Wreckin' Ball" (Dave Alvin, Doe) – 4:35
 "Year 1" – 1:16
 "Johnny Hit and Run Pauline" – 3:32

Personnel
X
John Doe – acoustic guitar, bass guitar, vocals
Exene Cervenka – vocals
D.J. Bonebrake – drums
Tony Gilkyson – guitar, vocals
Technical personnel
Kevin Patrick - executive producer
Alvin Clark - producer, engineer
Stanley Johnston - engineer
Gina Immel - assistant engineer
Jeff Poe - assistant engineer
Jay Willis - mastering
Kosh - coordination

Charts

See also
Sunset Strip

References

X (American band) live albums
1988 live albums
Elektra Records live albums
Albums recorded at the Whisky a Go Go